"Dance Again" is a song by American singer Selena Gomez from her third studio album Rare (2020), included as the second track on the standard version album and the ninth track on the deluxe version.

Promotion
"Dance Again" was scheduled to be used to promote CBS Sports and Turner Sports' coverage of the 2020 NCAA tournament. However, the song was never used, as the tournament was cancelled over concerns of the COVID-19 pandemic. Gomez announced that a portion of the proceeds from "Dance Again" would go towards the MusiCares COVID-19 Relief Fund.

Composition
"Dance Again" is a dance, electropop, electro, and funk song with influences of disco. In terms of music notation, it was composed in the key of D minor with a tempo of 112 beats per minute.

Music video
The song received a video titled "Dance Again (Performance Video)" which was directed by Craig Murray and released on March 26, 2020.

Credits and personnel
Credits adapted from the liner notes of Rare.

Recording locations
 Recorded at MXM Studios (Los Angeles, California), Interscope Studios (Santa Monica, California) and House Mouse Studios (Stockholm, Sweden)
 Mixed at MixStar Studios (Virginia Beach, Virginia)
 Mastered at Sterling Sound (Edgewater, New Jersey)

Personnel

 Selena Gomez – lead vocals, songwriting
 Mattman & Robin – production , vocal production, programming, drums, bass, synths, piano, guitar, percussion
 Mattias Larsson – songwriting
 Robin Fredriksson – songwriting
 Justin Tranter – songwriting
 Caroline Ailin – songwriting, backing vocals
 Bart Schoudel – engineering, vocal production
 Cory Bice – engineering
 Jeremy Lertola – engineering
 John Hanes – engineering
 Kevin Brunhober – assisting
 Mick Raskin – assisting
 Serban Ghenea – mixing
 Chris Gehringer – mastering

Charts

Year-end charts

Release history

References

2020 songs
Selena Gomez songs
Songs written by Selena Gomez
Songs written by Mattias Larsson
Songs written by Robin Fredriksson
Songs written by Justin Tranter
Songs written by Caroline Ailin
Charity singles
Songs about dancing